Brotherly love may refer to:

General
 Philia, a Greek word for love
 Brotherly love (philosophy)
 The New Commandment of Jesus, 
 The Second greatest commandment: "Love thy neighbor as thyself"

Television 
 Brotherly Love (1995 TV series), an American television series
 Brotherly Love (1999 TV series), a British television series
"Brotherly Love" (The Cleveland Show), an episode of The Cleveland Show
"Brotherly Love", episode of The Golden Girls
"Brotherly Love", three-episode story arc of the British television programme Cracker
"Brotherly Love", episode of In the Heat of the Night

Music 
"Brotherly Love" (Moe Bandy song), first recorded by Moe Bandy and later as a duet between Keith Whitley and Earl Thomas Conley
Brotherly Love, an album by Dean Dillon and Gary Stewart, or its title track
 "Brotherly Love", a song written by John Farrar and recorded by Olivia Newton-John on her album Music Makes My Day
 "Brotherly Love", a song recorded by Billy Dean in his album Young Man
 "Brotherly Love", a song written by The Constructus Corporation.

Films 
 Brotherly Love (1928 film), a 1928 American film
 Brotherly Love, a 1936 cartoon film
 Country Dance (film), a 1970 British film, released as Brotherly Love in the U.S.
 Brotherly Love (1985 film), a 1985 television film starring Judd Hirsch
 Brotherly Love (2015 film), a 2015 American film with Keke Palmer and Quincy

Other uses 
 Philadelphia, known as the City of Brotherly Love (Philadelphia means “brotherly love” in Greek)